Alisa Knows What to Do! is a Russian animated series, based on the books of Kir Bulychev about Alisa Selezneva. The premiere took place on 16 November 2013 on STS a day before the official birthday of Alisa, and three months later on February 3, 2014 on the Carousel TV channel. This is the first screen version of Alisa Selezneva in which many episodes of the series are original stories and not based directly on the books by Bulychev, and the first screen version made using computer animation.

Cast

English dubbing
Laurie Hymes as Alisa
Mike Pollock as Mr. Peterson, Poly-R, Zdob, Spaceship Voice
Michael Alston Baley as Protofelix
Marc Thompson as Eric Schroedinger, Dictator Dziki, Giant, Additional Voices
Kate Bristol as Marie White
Billy Bob Thompson as Alex Taylor, Curator Selgeh, Brr, Prince Taqlee, Arnold, Bol, Spaceport Voice, Security Guard
Alyson Leigh Rosenfeld as Natalie White, Alex's Mom
Jason Griffith as Professor Salazar, Gulby, Head Robot (307), Additional Voices
Graham Halstead as Truenox Duper
Michael Frazer as Dr. Gilliam
William Tost as Erik's Grandfather
J. David Brimmer as Protofelix
Wayne Grayson as Victimok, Sheriff, Trunox Duper (Test dub)
H.D. Quinn as General Draxpod, Showman
Tom Wayland as Itrod, Eeek, Dibalan Pilot, Phillip Soleko, Hikle, Scupulous, Raven, Barphbuds, Security Selgeh, Humorometr, Additional Voices
David Wills as Magusis, Dulby, Holmov, Ridic
Charles D. Cherrier as Alisa Chantal
Ryan Nicolls as Jan
Eileen Stevens as Mrs. Salazar, Gulby (Young), Infomercial Operator, Additional Voices
Melissa Hope as Flos, Denise, Angelina, Newscaster
Allen Enlow as August
Alysha Deslorieux as Madame Manna
Bill Timoney as Appert
Emily Bauer as Minister
Erica Schroeder as Queen Tira
Jake Paque as Talgut
Jason O'Connell as Little Giant
Samara Nayemi as Salda
Scottie Ray as Anur
Vanessa Gardner as Produces

Canadian Dubbing
Tajja Isen as Alisa 
Samuel Vincent as Truenox Duper
Rob Tinkler as Poly-R
Ian James Corlett as Professor Salazar
Linda Ballantyne as Mrs. Salazar
Kirby Morrow as Alex Taylor
Matt Hill as Eric Schroedinger
Bryn McAuley as Marie White
Alyson Court as Natalie White
George Buza as Mr. Peterson
Seán Cullen as Protofelix
David Berni as Victimok
Tony Daniels as Sheriff
Ty Olsson as Magusis
Juan Chioran as August
Emilie-Claire Barlow as Minister
Richard Ian Cox as Gulby
Tabitha St. Germain as Gulby (Young)
Dwayne Hill as Appert
Scott McCord as Talgut
Julie Lemieux as Queen Tiara
Ron Rubin as Jan
Patrick McKenna as Anur
Neil Crone as General Draxpod
Taylor Abrahamse as Curator Selgeh
Brian Drummond as Dictator Dziki

Russian dubbing
Darya Melnikova
Armen Dzhigarkhanyan
Miroslava Karpovich
Anna Ardova
Dmitry Nazarov
Alexey Kolgan
Irina Grishina
Viktor Andrienko
Valery Storozhik
Prokhor Chekhovskoy
Olga Syrina
Eugene Donskikh
Alexander Pozharov
Igor Harlamov
Alexander Lobanov

Guest appearance:
Igor Taradaikin
Yekaterina Sculkina
Dmitri Yermak
Natalia Bistrova
Pyotr Glanz
Anna Galler
Artur Smolyaninov
Anna Guchenkova
Gosha Kutsenko
Anton Bogdanov
Andrei Birin
Alexandra Uruslyak
Garik Harlamov

Episodes

Alisa CLUB
Additionally a separate cycle of humorous episodes were released in 2016 under the title of "Alisa CLUB".

Film
A film continuation of Alisa Knows What to Do! produced by Bazelevs, titled My Super Dad, was released on 30 March 2018. Voice cast of the film includes Darya Melnikova, Timur Rodriguez, Konstantin Khabensky and Vasilisa Savkina.

References

External links
 Official website of the series

STS (TV channel) original programming
Carousel (TV channel) original programming
Films based on works by Kir Bulychov
2013 Russian television series debuts
2016 Russian television series endings
2010s Russian television series
2010s animated television series
Russian children's animated comic science fiction television series
Animated television series about children
Russian computer-animated television series